George Karl Kopshaw (July 5, 1895 – December 26, 1934) was an American Major League Baseball catcher.

Biography
He was born on July 5, 1895, in Passaic, New Jersey. He died on December 26, 1934, in Lynchburg, Virginia.

References

Major League Baseball catchers
St. Louis Cardinals players
Greenville Spinners players
Charlotte Hornets (baseball) players
Cleveland Manufacturers players
Johnson City Soldiers players
Grand Rapids Homoners players
Flint Vehicles players
Syracuse Stars (minor league baseball) players
Baltimore Orioles (IL) players
Greensboro Patriots players
Kinston Eagles players
Rocky Mount Buccaneers players
Wilson Bugs players
Winston-Salem Twins players
Baseball players from New Jersey
Sportspeople from Passaic, New Jersey
1895 births
1934 deaths